RPM was a Canadian magazine that published the best-performing singles of Canada from 1964 to 2000. Twenty-six songs reached number one in 1984. Paul McCartney and Michael Jackson had the first number-one hit of the year with "Say Say Say", and The Honeydrippers finished the year at number one with "Sea of Love". Every artist that reached number one except Paul McCartney, Michael Jackson, Culture Club, Lionel Richie, Laura Branigan, and Stevie Wonder did so for the first time in 1984. Cyndi Lauper was the sole act that topped the chart with more than one single this year, with "Girls Just Want to Have Fun" and "Time After Time", staying a total of five weeks at number one. No Canadians topped their native country's chart in 1984.

Although Phil Collins and Wham! spent four issues at number one with "Against All Odds (Take a Look at Me Now)" and "Wake Me Up Before You Go-Go", respectively, it was Stevie Wonder's song "I Just Called to Say I Love You" that topped the RPM year-chart for 1984; it remained three weeks at the number-one position in October and November. The other singles that stayed at number one for at least three weeks were "Karma Chameleon" by Culture Club, "Time After Time" by Cyndi Lauper, "When Doves Cry" by Prince, and "What's Love Got to Do with It" by Tina Turner.

Chart history

Notes

See also
1984 in music
List of Billboard Hot 100 number ones of 1984 by Billboard
List of Cash Box Top 100 number-one singles of 1984 by Cashbox

References

External links
 RPM Magazine at the AV Trust
 RPM chart search at Library and Archives Canada

 
1984 record charts
1984